The Boilermaker Road Race is a USATF-certified  foot race and wheelchair race held annually in Utica, New York, United States. 
Although local recreational runners are the majority of entrants, the race is highly competitive, with international professional runners filling the top ranks. With the exception of 2020, when it was cancelled due to the COVID-19 pandemic, the Boilermaker has been held every year since 1978. Traditionally, the Boilermaker is held on the second Sunday in July, although the 2021 Boilermaker was held on October 10th due to COVID-related concerns. Although 15Ks are uncommon compared to other road races, the Boilermaker has been rated highly by running publications. 

The race course is primarily in the city of Utica, with the earlier portion largely within the Utica Parks and Parkway Historic District. The course passes through the suburbs New Hartford and Yorkville near Utica College. The course is hilly, changing 300 feet in elevation over its length: combined with the mid-summer heat, winning race times are generally longer than for other 15K races. The finish line lies outside the F.X. Matt Brewery, where post-race festivities are held.

Like many urban races in the United States, the Boilermaker was created during the 1970s running boom. The first Boilermaker was held on July 16, 1978, with a budget of $750 and 800 local runners participating. The name alludes to a primary underwriter of the race, the Utica Radiator Corporation (now Utica Boilers). The wheelchair section was added in 1980. The race gained prominence in 1983 when American distance runner Bill Rodgers won with a time of 44:38. From 1997 to 2006, the Boilermaker was known as the largest 15K race in the United States, but was overtaken by the Gate River Run in Jacksonville, Florida in later years. 

The Boilermaker has been described as an essential part of the identity of its host city, Utica, like the Peachtree Road Race in Atlanta, Georgia. Semi-unofficial performances and parties fill the sidewalk along much of the race course: Runners World magazine described the Boilermaker as "part road race, part festival."

Past winners
Key:

Due to COVID-19 concerns, international professional runners were not invited to the 2021 race. Thus, the winning times in that year's race are longer than in prior years, with Americans taking first place in both divisions for the first time since 1991.

References

External links
 Boilermaker Official website
 Utica Boilermaker 15k Individual Results 1978 and 1985-2006

Utica, New York
15K runs
Road running competitions in the United States
Sports competitions in New York (state)
Wheelchair racing